The Turrentine Historic District is a historic district in Gadsden, Alabama.  The district stretches along Turrentine Avenue and includes houses built during Gadsden's largest period of growth from 1891 through 1934.  The street, originally the lane leading from town to the home of General Daniel Clower Turrentine, was home to some of the city's most influential residents, including mayors, bankers, doctors, educators, and industrialists.  Architectural styles found in the district include Queen Anne, Neoclassical, Spanish Revival, Craftsman, and Tudor Revival.  The district was listed on the National Register of Historic Places in 2005.

References

National Register of Historic Places in Etowah County, Alabama
Historic districts in Etowah County, Alabama
Historic districts on the National Register of Historic Places in Alabama